Melbourne Gay and Lesbian Chorus (MGLC) was founded in Australia in 1990 by a gay performer and activist, Lawrence McGuire (1966). The chorus was first named 'AL sounds', due to its part affiliation with the Foundation. In April 1994, the name was changed to Melbourne Gay and Lesbian Chorus, reflecting the chorus's organizational independence and a desire to further challenge stereotypes.

Background

Gay Choirs in Australia
The first gay choir in Australia was Human Nature, an all-male, Sydney-based chorus. It began in 1981, and disbanded c. 1997. McGuire, unaware of the Sydney group, learned of the existence of gay choruses while listening to an LP record, The San Francisco Gay Men's Chorus Tours America 1981, at a party. Inspired by the discovery, McGuire, along with his roommates (including his sister, Kathleen McGuire, and gay friend Tuck Wah Leong), discussed the notion of forming a gay and lesbian choir in Melbourne. McGuire wanted to form a choir specifically with gay men and women in an effort to unify these sometimes divergent groups. AIDS had already caused much devastation in the gay community, and he believed that a choir would help to lift spirits and be a positive expression against homophobia. With a small group of men and women, both gay and straight, the first rehearsal was held on April 28,1990 at St Luke's Anglican Church in South Melbourne.

Sydney Gay and Lesbian Choir (SGLC) began less than a year later in January 1991, independent of the Melbourne chorus. Rob Holland founded SGLC in response to the lack of Australian representation in the Cultural Festival of the Vancouver Gay Games, held in August 1990.

Since then, many choirs with an LGBT focus have formed in Australia and also in New Zealand:

Chronology of Gay Choirs in Australia and New Zealand
 Gay Liberation Quire (men's), Sydney (1981-1987)
 Melbourne Gay & Lesbian Chorus, founded 1990
 Sydney Gay and Lesbian Choir, founded 1991
 Gay & Lesbian Singers (GALS) Auckland, founded 1992
 Canberra Gay and Lesbian Qwire, founded 1993
 Gay and Lesbian Singers of Western Australia (GALSWA), founded 1993
 Adelaide Gay & Lesbian Singers (1996 - 1999)
 Brisbane Pride Choir, founded 1998
 Adelaide Gay & Lesbian Qwire, founded 2001
 shOUT Youth Chorus (formerly Melbourne Gay & Lesbian Youth Chorus), founded 2005
 Cairns Out Loud Lesbian & Gay Choir, founded 2007
 Homophones, gay men's chorus in Wellington (2007-2011)
 LOW REZ Melbourne Male Choir, founded 2008
 Glamaphones (mixed chorus), Wellington, founded 2011
 The Decibelles Female Pop Choir Inc, Melbourne, founded 2012
 QTas - Tasmania's LGBTIQ Choir, founded 2013
 True Colours Chorus, Darwin, founded 2018

Conductors
MGLC's first musical director was Trevor Dunn. Dunn, who was a music teacher at Kilbreda College, a Catholic girls' high school in Mentone, directed the group for a number of years before succumbing to AIDS in 1992.

Following a series of short-term conductors, Tuck Wah Leong took the helm as musical director in about 1994 and directed the MGLC's award-winning first CD and its first international tour.

In 2001, MGLC appointed conductor Adrian Kirk, under whose direction the chorus developed a more sophisticated, classical sound.

Jonathon Welch AM - of the renowned operatic trio Tenor Australis, and former conductor of the Sydney Gay and Lesbian Choir - served as MGLC's Musical director from 2005 to 2007.

Darren Wicks was the musical director for 2008.

In 2009, Adrian Schultz, the director of the Youth Chorus, was appointed musical director and served until July 2013. Subsequently, he served as guest conductor of the Youth Chorus for the Christmas concert in 2014 and on multiple occasions since.

Ben Leske was appointed musical director of the Melbourne Gay and Lesbian Youth Chorus (now known as shOUT) in 2009 and led the Youth Chorus until early 2015, for its first major performance, The Sound of Youth (2010), and during a period of significant growth in its membership. In November 2017, Ben graduated with a PhD in Music Therapy from the University of Melbourne. The focus of the PhD was choir leadership, inspired by his interest in the well-being of members of the Melbourne Gay and Lesbian Youth Chorus.

Dr Kathleen McGuire served as interim musical director in 2009 and then served as musical director from 2013 to 2015. She also conducted MGLC at Trevor Dunn's memorial service in 1992 and at several annual AIDS memorial services at St Mark's Anglican Church in the early 1990s.

Drew Downing was appointed as musical director in 2015.

Community involvement
Since its inception, the MGLC has provided support and outreach to the GLBTI community. Examples of regular community appearances include: annual Stonewall commemorative service for the Metropolitan Community Church; World AIDS Day ceremonies and services for the People Living With AIDS; Australia Day Picnic for GLBTI radio station, JOY Melbourne 94.9 FM.

shOUT Youth Chorus
In August 2005, MGLC founded the Melbourne Gay and Lesbian Youth Chorus, the first chorus of its kind in Australasia.

The inaugural Youth Chorus musical director was Gudula Kinzler.

Gudula, a German citizen, was in Australia for a few years, and has now returned to Germany, where she is the musical director of Die Rheintochter, a mixed women's choir, based in Cologne, Germany.

They perform their own major stand-alone performances, and also join with the main chorus at numerous events.

They recorded their first CD, Count Me In, in 2008.

In November 2015, MGLYC formally changed their name to shOUT Youth Chorus. The members felt that it was important to re-brand in such a way that recognises the Youth Chorus's inclusion of people of diverse genders and sexualities.

shOUT welcomes young people of all types and celebrates that diversity.

Achievements

Awards
1st Prize, Community Choir Section, Boroondara Eisteddfod, 1995
Best Choir Award, Australian National Festival of the Voice, 1996
Rainbow Award, Best Live Performance, 2004
Rainbow Award, Best Live Performance, 2005
Rainbow Award, Best New Community Event for Youth Chorus's debut concert, 2006
Best Choir Sing, Sing For Good, 2015
Best Choir Sing, Sing For Good, 2016

Touring
 1998, August: European tour to Frankfurt, Freiberg Vienna, and Amsterdam for Gay Games
 1996, February: Sydney Gay and Lesbian Mardi Gras
 2000: Our Family concert, Canberra
 2001: Adelaide Lesbian & Gay Cultural Festival
 2002, November: Gay Games in Sydney, Australia
 2006, July: Gay Games in Chicago, and OutGames in Montreal
 2013, July: Festival of Voices in Hobart, Tasmania
 2016, February: Out and Loud Festival in Auckland, New Zealand
2019 October: Out and Loud Festival in Canberra, Australian Capital Territory

Performance highlights
1990: First concert: Steppin' Out, Caulfield Town Hall
1995: Qantas 75th birthday, Melbourne Zoo
1998, 5 August: Gay Games Choir Festival, Concertgebouw, Amsterdam
1999, 27, 28 March: Let’s Misbehave concert, Newton Theater, Sydney
2002, 7 November: Sing Out to the World concert, Sydney Opera House
2002: Virgin Megastore opening with Sir Richard Branson, South Yarra
2003, 24 February: concert with Seattle Men's Chorus and Ann Hampton Callaway, Melbourne Town Hall
2006, 2 March: concert with Jimmy Somerville, Justice Michael Kirby, Bob Downe and Eddie Perfect at Hamer Hall
2006, 19 July: Gay Games choral concert, Jay Pritzker Pavilion, Chicago
2007, 15 & 16 September: On Broadway, Malvern Town Hall
2010: The Sound of Youth (inaugural Youth Chorus concert), Gasworks Theatre
2012, 13 October: Rainbow Dreaming - songs of Australia, St Mark's Church Fitzroy
2012, 8 December: Hallelujah It's The Chorus, St Mark's Church Fitzroy
2013, 20 July: Out in the Spotlight - songs of stage and screen, Preston Town Hall
2014, 5 October: No Place I'd Rather Be, Methodist Ladies College, Kew
2015, 15 August: Celebrate 25 (25th anniversary concert), St Kilda Town Hall
2015, 17 October: Not So Quiet - A rainbow reunion (10th anniversary Youth Chorus concert), Fitzroy Town Hall
2016, 20 February: Out and Loud Choral Festival, Auckland
2016, 18 June: Jukebox - Swinging songs of the 50s and 60s, Clocktower Centre Moonee Ponds
2016, 14–16 July: Dolly Diamond's Christmas in July, The Melba Spiegeltent Collingwood
2016, 15 October: Rodgers+Hart+Hammerstein - The sublime music of Richard Rodgers, Lorenz Hart and Oscar Hammerstein II, Church of All Nations (Melbourne)
2016, 10 December: Summer Sing Fling - A collaboration of Summer and Christmas music with Low Rez Male Choir, shOUT Youth Chorus and The Decibelles Female Pop Choir, Metropolitan Meat Market Melbourne

Affiliations
MGLC is an affiliate member of the Gay and Lesbian Association of Choruses (GALA Choruses) and a member of the Australian National Choral Association.

Discography
Four Songs (Cassette Tape) (1995)
Kaleidoscope (CD - MGLC001) (1996)
MGLC Meets Queerfloten (CD - Live recording from Freiberg, Germany) (1996)
Inflight (CD - MGLC004 - Live recording at James Tatoulis Auditorium, Methodist Ladies College, Kew) (1998)
Walk on By (CD - MGLC005) (2002) 
Evolution (CD) (2006 - MGLC006)
Feelin' Groovy (CD - MGLC007) (2006)
Count Me In (Youth Chorus) (CD) (2008)
Hallelujah! It's The Chorus (CD - Live recording at St Mark's Anglican Church, Fitzroy) (2013)

References

External links
Melbourne Gay and Lesbian Chorus official website
Melbourne Gay and Lesbian Chorus at My Space
 Australian National Choral Association official website
GALA Choruses official website
SING OUT! official website
LEGATO official website
Australasian Gay & Lesbian Choirs' Newsletter

Australian choirs
LGBT choruses
Organisations based in Melbourne
LGBT organisations in Australia
1990 establishments in Australia
LGBT culture in Melbourne
Musical groups established in 1990
Musical groups from Melbourne